Bodyflight, or body flight, is the term in the skydiving, which means staying or moving of a body or system of bodies in the air flow. It is one of the most dynamically developing sports in the world. In the windtunnel sport parachuting and skydiving, bodyflight is performed by applying air flow on certain parts of a body, to control the body any muscular forces can be used.

As a tool for learning to control the body flight, there is a vertical wind tunnel, which makes it possible to fly in the air, simulating free fall due to the created air flow (on average, about 190 km/h).
 
Bodyflight includes various flight poses, movements and flight transits, when combined, flight elements (tricks) are formed. Also this include turns, rolls, lateral movement, fall rate control, and other acrobatics in the air. The skill of bodyflight makes it possible for skydivers to fly closer to each other while they are falling, to allow them to link together in formation skydiving, then fly apart to a safe distance before opening parachutes.  
 
The flight pose is the body position controlled by the muscular effort in the air flow. There are many different poses, including "mantis", "bumblebee", and  "dragon". Flight movement is the movement or rotation of a body in the air flow in a certain direction. Flight transit is a transition from one flight pose to another (changing the areas of the body, affected by the air flow).

Bodyflight is accomplished via increasing/decreasing the drag of your body, using arms and legs as rudders for bodyflight motion control, as well as other techniques similar to that of an airplane. Professional athletes who fly through the air for long distances, such as ski jumping, have also used certain bodyflight techniques to increase jumping distance by manipulating their bodies to be more airfoil-like.  Frequent visitors to a vertical wind tunnel are often called 'tunnel rats', much like frequent visitors to ski slopes are called 'ski bums'. Some body flying enthusiasts develop their tunnel-flying skills not for sky diving training, but in order to be able to give professional performances.

Flight poses

References

External links 

 Indoor Skydiving Is Real, Painful, And Definitely Sports — Vice
 La France dominante au Championnat du monde de chute libre — Le Courrier Laval
Parachuting